No Man's Woman (Swedish: Ingen mans kvinna) is a 1953 Swedish drama film directed by Lars-Eric Kjellgren and starring Alf Kjellin, Birger Malmsten and Ann-Marie Gyllenspetz. It was shot at the Råsunda Studios in Stockholm with location shooting also taking place in Norway. The film's sets were designed by the art director P.A. Lundgren.

Cast
 Alf Kjellin as Arne Persson
 Birger Malmsten as 	Erland Klemensson
 Ann-Marie Gyllenspetz as 	Imber Ersson
 Aurore Palmgren as 	Arne's Mother
 Lissi Alandh as 	Judith Henriksson
 Max von Sydow as 	Olof
 Kolbjörn Knudsen as 	Jonas Persson
 Tryggve Larssen as Lapp-Nicke
 Ella Hval as Lapp-Kari
 Ingerid Vardund as 	Mimmi
 Marit Halset as 	Åse
 Märta Dorff as 	Mrs. Henriksson
 Olle Hilding as 	Henriksson, Judith's father 
 Axel Högel as Vicar 
 Uno Larsson as Verger 
 Josua Bengtson as School Master 
 Wilma Malmlöf as 	Woman at Henriksson's

References

Bibliography 
 Qvist, Per Olov & von Bagh, Peter. Guide to the Cinema of Sweden and Finland. Greenwood Publishing Group, 2000.

External links 
 

1953 films
Swedish drama films
1953 drama films
1950s Swedish-language films
Films directed by Lars-Eric Kjellgren
Swedish black-and-white films
Films shot in Norway
Films based on Swedish novels
1950s Swedish films